Kramfors-Alliansen Fotboll is a Swedish football club located in Kramfors.

Background
Kramfors-Alliansen Fotboll currently plays in Division 3 Mellersta Norrland which is the fifth tier of Swedish football. They play their home matches at the Kramfors IP in Kramfors.

The club is affiliated to Ångermanlands Fotbollförbund.

References

External links
 Kramfors-Alliansen – Official website

Football clubs in Västernorrland County